Raphaëlle Branche (born 1972) is a French historian, professor of modern history at Paris Nanterre University. She is an expert on torture in the Algerian War, and more broadly on colonial violence and colonial wars.

Life
In 2001 Branche published her doctoral thesis, La torture et l'armée pendant la Guerre d'Algérie. In 2014 Branche became professor at the University of Rouen. In 2019 she became professor at Paris Nanterre University.

Works
 La torture et l'armée pendant la Guerre d'Algérie: 1954-1962. Paris: Gallimard, 2001.
 La Guerre d'Algérie : une histoire apaisée?. Paris: Editions du Seuil, 2005.
 (ed. with Sylvie Thénault) La France en guerre, 1954-1962: expériences métropolitaines de la guerre d'indépendance algérienne. Paris: Autremont, 2008.
 (ed. with Fabrice Virgili) Rape in wartime. New York: Palgrave Macmillan, 2013.
 (ed. with Xavier Bougarel and Cloé Drieu) Combatants of Muslim origin in European armies in the twentieth century: far from jihad. London: Bloomsbury Academic, 2017.
 Papa, qu’as-tu fait en Algérie?. La Découverte. 2020.

References

External links
 
 This is Not a War: Raphaëlle Branche and Adam Shatz

1972 births
Living people
French historians
French women historians
Academic staff of the University of Rouen Normandy
Academic staff of Paris Nanterre University